Diego Scaglia (born 29 July 1967 in Córdoba, Argentina) is an Argentinian-Italian former rugby union player and a current coach. He played as a lock.

Scaglia first played for La Tablada, in Argentina, from 1986 to 1994. He moved to Tarvisium, in Italy, for the season of 1994/95, being assigned to Benetton Treviso the following season. He played at Benetton Rugby Treviso, from 1995/96 to 2000/01, winning 4 Italian Championship titles, in 1995/96, 1997/98, 1998/99 and 2000/01, and the Cup of Italy, in 1997/98. His final team was Silea, where he played from 2001/02 to 2002/03.

He adopted Italian citizenship because of his ancestry, which made him eligible to play for Italy. He had 6 caps, from 1994 to 1999, scoring 1 try, 5 points on aggregate. He was called for the 1995 Rugby World Cup, but he never played.

After finishing his player career, he became a coach, being in charge of Tarvisium, from 2004/05 to 2006/07, and of Italy national team in the U-18 category, from 2008 to 2010.

References

External links

1967 births
Argentine rugby union players
Argentine rugby union coaches
Italian rugby union players
Italy international rugby union players
Italian rugby union coaches
Rugby union locks
Living people
Sportspeople from Córdoba, Argentina